The 2017–18 NCAA Division I men's ice hockey season began in October 2017 and ended with the Frozen Four in April 2018. This was the 71st season in which an NCAA ice hockey championship was held, and US college hockey's 124th year overall.

Conference realignment
The only conference change for 2017-18 was that Notre Dame moved from Hockey East to the Big Ten as an associate member for men's hockey.

Polls

Regular season

Standings

2018 NCAA tournament

Note: * denotes overtime period(s)

Player stats

Scoring leaders

GP = Games played; G = Goals; A = Assists; Pts = Points; PIM = Penalty minutes

Leading goaltenders
The following goaltenders lead the NCAA in goals against average while playing at least 33% of their team's total minutes.

GP = Games played; Min = Minutes played; W = Wins; L = Losses; T = Ties; GA = Goals against; SO = Shutouts; SV% = Save percentage; GAA = Goals against average

Awards

NCAA

Atlantic Hockey

Big Ten

ECAC

Hockey East

NCHC

WCHA

Hobey Baker Award

Bold names are Hobey "Hat-trick" finalists

Mike Richter Award

See also
 2017–18 NCAA Division II men's ice hockey season
 2017–18 NCAA Division III men's ice hockey season

References

 
NCAA ice hockey